James Gaffney may refer to:

James Anthony Gaffney (1928–2016), British civil engineer
James E. Gaffney (1868–1932), American owner of the Boston Braves
James J. Gaffney (1863–1946), American architect
James J. Gaffney III (born 1942), American attorney and politician
James Gaffney (politician) (1853–1913), Australian politician for the Electoral district of Lyell